The Offinso Midwifery Training College is public tertiary health institution in the Offinso in the Ashanti Region of Ghana.  The college is in the Offinso Municipality. The Nurses and Midwifery Council (NMC) is the regulates the activities, curriculum and examination of the student nurses and midwives. The council's mandate Is enshrined under section 4(1) of N.R.C.D 117.

References

Nursing and midwifery colleges in Ghana